Chaunsky (masculine), Chaunskaya (feminine), or Chaunskoye (neuter) may refer to:
Chaunsky District, a district of Chukotka Autonomous Okrug, Russia
Chaunskaya Bay, a bay in the East Siberia Sea, Russia